The 2005 Real Salt Lake season was the first season of the team's existence. The team ended with poor results, being the second lowest of the general table in the league of (5–22–5).

Squad

2005 roster

Competitions

Major League Soccer

Western Conference

Results summary

Regular season

April

May

June

July

August

September

October

U.S. Open Cup

Third round

References

Real Salt Lake seasons
Real Salt Lake
Real Salt Lake
Real Salt Lake